In enzymology, a fructose 5-dehydrogenase is an enzyme that catalyzes the chemical reaction

D-fructose + acceptor  5-dehydro-D-fructose + reduced acceptor

Thus, the two substrates of this enzyme are D-fructose and acceptor, whereas its two products are 5-dehydro-D-fructose and reduced acceptor.

This enzyme belongs to the family of oxidoreductases, specifically those acting on the CH-OH group of donor with other acceptors. The systematic name of this enzyme class is D-fructose:acceptor 5-oxidoreductase. Other names in common use include fructose 5-dehydrogenase (acceptor), D-fructose dehydrogenase, and D-fructose:(acceptor) 5-oxidoreductase.

References

 
 

EC 1.1.99
Enzymes of unknown structure